Boris Vain (born 11 March 1993) is a French born Monegasque bobsledder. He competed in the two-man event at the 2018 Winter Olympics. In January 2022, Vain qualified to compete for Monaco at the 2022 Winter Olympics in the two-man bob event.

References

External links
 

1993 births
Living people
Monegasque male bobsledders
Olympic bobsledders of Monaco
Bobsledders at the 2018 Winter Olympics
Bobsledders at the 2022 Winter Olympics
Place of birth missing (living people)
Monegasque people of French descent